Python kyaiktiyo, the Myanmar short-tailed python, is a python species endemic to Myanmar that is known only from the holotype collected in Yetagon Myaung at an altitude of . It has been listed on the IUCN Red List as Vulnerable since 2012.

Taxonomy
Python kyaiktiyo was first described by George R. Zug, Steve W. Gotte, and Jeremy F. Jacobs in 2011 based on a female specimen collected in Kyaikhtiyo Wildlife Sanctuary in 2002. The presence of unique traits and sufficient allopatry indicate that it is distinct from its nearest geographical counterpart, the blood python.

Description
In 2002, an unusual female python was found. In 2011, it was named as a new species. Since discovery, only a few specimens have been found and thus there is very little information known about its size and weight. Due to common features, the species has been grouped with the three species of the short-tailed python group. The Myanmar short-tailed python differs in the large number of ventral scales (180 or more). Its body has a light brown base with rusty colored stripes and blotches on top. They are smooth-scaled, primarily terrestrial, and possess, as do most pythons, facial pits that sense differentiations in radiant heat. Overall, they are naturally reddish-brown, with dark brown to black mottled spots running the entire length of the body.

Distribution and habitat
Python kyaiktiyo is thought to be endemic to Myanmar's Tenghyo Range in Mon State, though it has been observed rarely in the region.

References

kyaiktiyo
Snakes of Asia
Reptiles of Myanmar
Reptiles described in 2011